The Association of Waterways Cruising clubs is a waterway society and umbrella organisation in England, UK. It was founded in the early 1960s by the St Pancras, Dunstable, Uxbridge and Lee and Stort boat clubs as an inter-club scheme for an emergency service for boaters, and for safe overnight moorings.

The Association grew quickly from the original four clubs to eighteen, and it published its first handbook giving club locations and phone numbers. In the late Seventies, there were eighty clubs, and a regional structure was adopted.

Today, the AWCC represents over twenty thousand affiliated boat owners, through their membership of more than a hundred cruising clubs. The association enters consultations and negotiations with British Waterways, the Environment Agency and other bodies, and it is an Associate Member of the Parliamentary Waterways Group.

Members of AWCC:
Airedale Boat Club, Ash Tree Boat Club, Ashby Canal Association, Aylesbury Canal Society
Basingstoke Canal Boating Club, Black Buoy Cruising Club, Boaters Christian Fellowship, Bridgewater Motor Boat Club, Byfleet Boat Club
Coombeswood Canal Trust, Coventry Canal Society, Cutweb Internet Boating Club
Derby Motor Boat Club
Electric Boat Association
Lichfield Cruising Club, Lincoln Boat Club, Longwood Boat Club, Lymm Cruising Club
Mersey Motor Boat Club
Norbury Cruising Club, North Cheshire Cruising Club
Oundle Cruising Club
Peterborough Yacht Club, Pewsey Wharf Boat Club
Rammey Marsh Cruising Club
Sale Cruising Club, Saul Junction Boat Owners Club, Sea Otter Owners Club, Soar Boating Club, South Pennine Boat Club, Stafford Boat Club, St Pancras Cruising Club, Seamaster Club, Strawberry Island Boat Club
Tamworth Cruising Club
Watch House Cruising Club, Waterway Recovery Group Cruising Club, West London Motor Cruising Club, Wheelton Boat Club, Wilderness Boat Owners Club

See also
List of waterway societies in the United Kingdom

External links
Official Website
House of Commons Select Committee on Environment, Food and Rural Affairs: Memorandum submitted by the Association of Waterways Cruising Clubs
House of Commons Select Committee on Environment, Transport and Regional Affairs Fourth Report: List of Witnesses incl. AWCC
House of commons Select Committee on Environment, Food and Rural Affairs Eight Report: No. 7, Ev 144: AWCC
AWCC Press Release for the Campaign Cruise to the Houses of Parliament in protest against Defra cuts

Waterways organisations in the United Kingdom